Kenworthy may refer to:

People
 Alexandra Kenworthy (born 1932), American voice actress
 Bill Kenworthy (1886–1950), American baseball player
 Christina Kenworthy-Browne, British Roman Catholic nun and historian
 Christopher Kenworthy, Australian writer and film director
 David Kenworthy, 11th Baron Strabolgi (1914–2010), English politician
 Dick Kenworthy (1941–2010), American baseball player
 Duncan Kenworthy (born 1949), British film producer
 Esther Kenworthy Waterhouse (1857–1944), British artist
 Gus Kenworthy (born 1991), American freestyle skier
 John Kenworthy (1883–1940), English aviation engineer and aircraft designer
 Joseph Kenworthy, 10th Baron Strabolgi (1886-1953), British politician
 Mary-Anne Kenworthy (born 1956), Australian brothel owner
 Max Kenworthy, British musician
 Michael Kenworthy (born 1975), American actor
 Roger Kenworthy (born 1971), Australian rugby league footballer
 Shirra Kenworthy (born 1943), Canadian figure skater
 Stuart Kenworthy, British comedy writer
 Tony Kenworthy (born 1958), an English former footballer

Other uses
 Kenworthy Hall, a plantation house near Marion, Alabama

See also
 Kenworth (disambiguation)